Sværtegade 3 is a listed property in the Old Town of Copenhagen, Denmark, consisting of a four-storey building from the 18th century fronting the street and a large, three-winged building from 1829 in the courtyard. J. G Schwart & Søn was from 1806 to 1983 based at the site. The entire complex was listed on the Danish registry of protected buildings and places in 1918. Harald Conrad Stilling's shop facade and interior from 1847 is part of the heritage listing.

History

18th century

The site was formerly part of a large corner property, comprising what is now Sværtegade 13 and Pilestræde 4244. This property was listed in Copenhagen's first cadastre of 1689 as No. 05 in Købmager Quarter and belonged to one Albert Hein's widow at that time.

The buildings on the site were destroyed in the Copenhagen Fire of 1728. The fire site was subsequently divided into three smaller properties. In  1750, by master builder  Gotfrid Schuster constructed two two-storey houses with three-bay gabled wall dormers, one at present-day No. 3 and the other one at No. 1, were subsequently constructed at the site by master builder  Gotfrid Schuster in  1730. The corner property was listed in the new cadastre of 1756 as No. 96 and was owned by mail official (pstforvalter) Jens Lange at that time. The property now known as Sværtegade 3 was marked as No.  96B on Christian Gedde's map of Købmager Quarter from 1757. The house at No. 3 was heightened by two storeys in 1791.

1806-1983: The Schwartz  family
 
Sværtegade 3 was in 1806 acquired by turner Johan Adam Schwartz (1751-1835). He had become a partner in his old master S. I. Graumann's business  back in 1801 and had after Graumann's death in 1704 married his widow and continued the workshop alone.

The workshop was after Schwartz's death in 1835 handed down to his nephew Johan Georg Schwartz (1789-1864). The name J. G. Schwartz & Søn was adopted in 1847 when his son Johan Adam Schwartz (1820-1874) was made a partner. The architect Hans Conrad Stilling was that same year charged with installing a modern shop in the ground floor of the building in Sværtegade.

Johan Adam Schwartz's widow Thora Louise Schwartz continued the operations after her husband's death until her own death the following year. The firm was then taken over by Frans Schwartz and H. E. Kllein. After Frans Swartz's death in 1917, it was converted into a limited company (aktieselskab.

Later history
In 1983, J. G. Swartz closed after trading from the same location for 177 years. The buildings were renovated into offices. In 2010, Bertlesen & Schewing was commissioned to restore and transform the building into a restaurant, hotel and office space.

Architecture

Sværtegade 3
 
Being built on an irregularly shaped site, considerably deeper to the east (right) than to the west (left), Sværtegade 3 is five bays wide towards the street but six bays wide towards the yard. The facade towards the street is painted white. The name I. G. Schzartz & Søn is still seen on a band above the ground floor and the old house number (No. 170) is still seen above the gate. The facade is finished by a cornice supported by six sculpted corbels. The curved rear side of the building is painted yellow. The red tile roof features three zinc-clad dormer windows with white pediments.

 
The three large, arch-headed shop windows in the ground floor, a tell tale feature of commercial properties from the Late Neoclassical period (1830–1855), were a novelty in Denmark at the time. The tracery bars were necessary since it was still not possible to create larger window panes. Below the central shop window is a cellar entrance.

 
The gate is topped by a Transom window. The transom features the name I. G. Schwartz & Søn as well followed by "Grundl. I 1801" )"Founded in 1801"). The gateway makes a suttle bend halfway through the building due to the irregular shape of the site and is towards the yard placed in a curved part of the facade. Its barrel vaulted ceiling is richly decorated and the walls are decorated with pilasters with capitels. The floor is paved with timber blocks. A door-less opening in the gateway's wall affords access to the building's main staircase.

Pilestræde 40C
 
The building in the courtyard (Pilestræde 40C), a long, three-storey building constructed on a foundation of stone ashlars, forms the northn margin of the courtyard. It consists of a 12-bay main wing flanked by two shorter side wings of which the eastern side wing is attached to the rear side of Sværtegade 5. The three easternmost bays of the main wing are wider than the others. The western side wing is four bays long and has a mono-pitched roof. The eastern side wing consists of three bays, a rounded corner bay and one bay in the gable..

Today
Sværtegade 3 and the adjacent building at No. 1 were both acquired by Odense-based Barfoed Group in 2910.

Gallery

Further reading
 Bast, Jørgen: Schwartzerne i Sværtegade, 1951.

References

External links

Listed buildings and structures in Copenhagen